Bab El Shaaria is a station on Cairo Metro, part of phase 1 of Line 3. it is located in  Bab El Shaaria Square at the intersection of Port Said with EL-Geish street.

History
Bab El Shaaria Station was inaugurated on 21 February 2012 as part of phase 1 of Line 3.

Overview
The station consists of three floors, with four entrances and elevators to transport passengers from the street level to the station platform and the length of the station is 150 meters and width of 22.90 meters and a depth of 20 meters from the station ground.

In addition, the station have a contactless fare collection system as well as an integrated supervision and communication system supplied by the Thales Group.

Station layout

See also
 Cairo Metro
 Cairo Metro Line 3
 List of Cairo Metro stations

References

External links
 Cairo Metro
 National Authority for Tunnels official website

Cairo metro stations
2012 establishments in Egypt
Railway stations opened in 2012